Brasil Game Show (known by the initials BGS and originally titled Rio Game Show (RGS)) is a yearly Brazilian video game convention organized by business executive Marcelo Tavares, that is currently held in São Paulo and is the largest gaming convention in Latin America.

History
Brasil Game Show was first held on June 21, 2009, in Rio de Janeiro where it ran under the name of Rio Game Show and had an attendance of 4,000 participants. Until that year, Brazil had been holding no similar events for about 3 years. The attendance doubled in the second edition, November 28 and 29, 2009. In the following year the convention retitled itself to the current name of Brasil Game Show and had an attendance of 30,000 convention goers. In 2011 the convention received over 60,000 convention goers, exceeding the 50,000 attendees expectation for that year.

Still in 2011, it was announced that the 2012 convention would be held in São Paulo.

In 2012 the expectation was of about 80,000 visitors for the convention. But the Event once again exceeded expectations, hitting the 100,000 attendees mark and consolidating its biggest Latin American games convention title.

The 2013 edition was held in São Paulo, October 25 (press only), 26, 27, 28 and 29 (open to the public). The expectations of 150,000 attendees were once again exceeded and the space allocated to the convention was doubled in comparison with the previous year.

In 2014, the space allocated to the Event was once again doubled, and took all five pavilions of Expo Center Norte, in São Paulo. The Event occurred on October 8 (press and business only), 9, 10, 11 and 12 (open to the public), and there was an estimated attendance of 250,000. Until half March, big companies had already announced their presence in the Event, like Ubisoft, Ongame, Razer and others.

Events

References

External links
  

2009 establishments in Brazil
Annual events in Brazil
Events in São Paulo
October events
Recurring events established in 2009
Trade fairs in Brazil
Video game trade shows
Video gaming in Brazil